Don Mlangeni Eric Nawa (born 7 June 1959), is a South African actor. He is best known for his roles in the popular serials Sgudi 'Snaysi, Isidingo and The Throne.

Personal life
He was born on 7 June 1959 in Soweto, South Africa.

He is married and is a father of five.

Career
He started acting career in theatre but then soon moved to Zulu drama Hlala Kwabafileyo in 1993.He also acted in the Zulu film Ubambo Lwam'  as David.

Then in 1995, he acted in the Cycle Simenon. In 1998, he made the popular role 'Zebedee Matabane' in the television soap opera Isidingo. He continued to play the role until 2014 with a huge success. He received Golden Horn Award for Best Actor in a TV Soap in 2006 for his role in Isidingo. However he left the series in early 2014 following a disciplinary dispute with the show. In 2007 and 2010 he was nominated twice for SAFTA Golden Horn Award for Best Actor in a TV Soap.

In 2018, he made a lead role 'Moseki', a royal family member and younger brother of the queen, in the popular Mzansi Magic telenovela The Throne. In the same year, he received the Lifetime Achievement Award at the 2018 Royalty Soapie Awards for his contribution to the television industry.

He also played the popular role 'Laqhasha' in five seasons in the television serial 'Sgudi 'Snaysi. In 2019, he made his film debut in the film Losing Lerato where he played the role 'SWAT Commander'. In 2020, he joined the cast of serial Legacy. Later in 2020, he has confirmed that the serial Uzalo will be his last production as an actor.

Television roles

 Abomama - Season 1 as Mfundisi
 Isidingo - Season 1 as Zebedee Matabane
 Legacy - Season 1 as John
 Rockville - Season 3 as Diliza
 'Sgudi 'Snaysi - Season 1 as Laqhasha
 Stokvel - Season 3 as Laquashe
 The Republic - Season 1 as Bhambatha
 The River - Season 1 as Thato
 The Throne - Season 1 as Prince Moseki Kwena
 Uzalo - Season 1 as Dhlomo
 Zaziwa - Season 1 as himself
The Estate

References

External links
 

Living people
South African male television actors
South African male film actors
1959 births
People from Soweto